Mohammad Nuruzzaman is a first-class and List A cricketer from Bangladesh. He was born on 8 June 1974 in Rajshahi and is a right-handed batsman and right arm medium pacer.  He appeared for Rajshahi Division between 2000/01 and 2005/06. He scored 4 first-class hundreds in his 35 games, with a best of 161 against Barisal Division and took 6 for 135 against Biman Bangladesh Airlines with the ball. He also scored two fifties in the one day arena.

References

1974 births
Living people
Bangladeshi cricketers
Rajshahi Division cricketers